Zoltán Kereki (born 13 July 1953) is a Hungarian football defender who played for Hungary in the 1978 FIFA World Cup. He also played for Szombathelyi Haladás.

References

External links
 

1953 births
Living people
Hungarian footballers
Hungary international footballers
Association football defenders
Szombathelyi Haladás footballers
1978 FIFA World Cup players
Zalaegerszegi TE players
People from Kőszeg
Sportspeople from Vas County